Phumzile Maqondwana (born ) is a South African rugby union player for the  in the United Rugby Championship and the Currie Cup. His regular position is flank.

References

South African rugby union players
Living people
1997 births
People from Mbhashe Local Municipality
Rugby union flankers
Golden Lions players
Pumas (Currie Cup) players
Rugby union players from the Eastern Cape
Bulls (rugby union) players
Blue Bulls players